Tadepalligudem Municipality is the local self government in Tadepalligudem of the Indian state of Andhra Pradesh. It is classified as a Selection Grade Municipality.

Administration

Tadepalligudem municipality was formed in the year 1958. The present municipal commissioner of the city is P Balaswami .

Awards and achievements
The city is one among the 31 cities in the state to be a part of water supply and sewerage services mission known as Atal Mission for Rejuvenation and Urban Transformation (AMRUT). In 2015, as per the Swachh Bharat Abhiyan of the Ministry of Urban Development, Tadepalligudem Municipality was ranked 352nd in the country.

See also
 List of municipalities in Andhra Pradesh

References

1958 establishments in Andhra Pradesh
Government agencies established in 1958
Municipal Councils in Andhra Pradesh